ONS or Ons may refer to:

 ONS (TV channel), Netherlands and Belgium
 Office for National Statistics, UK
 Ons Island, Spain
 National Office of Statistics, Algeria
  ('Supreme National Sports Authority'), German body now named 
 Object Naming Service, similar to Domain Name Service (DNS) 
 Occipital nerve stimulation, a medical treatment
 Oncology Nursing Society, U.S.
 Onslow Airport (IATA code), Australia
 Order of Nova Scotia, a civilian honor
 Original Night Stalker, an American serial killer
 Oulu Nice Soccer, a football club in Finland
 One-night stand